Himalia, or Jupiter VI, is the largest irregular satellite of Jupiter, with a diameter of at least . It is the sixth largest Jovian satellite, after the four Galilean moons and Amalthea. It was discovered by Charles Dillon Perrine at the Lick Observatory on 3 December 1904 and is named after the nymph Himalia, who bore three sons of Zeus (the Greek equivalent of Jupiter). It is one of the largest planetary moons in the Solar System not imaged in detail, and the third largest not imaged in detail within the orbit of Neptune.

Discovery 
Himalia was discovered by Charles Dillon Perrine at the Lick Observatory on 3 December 1904 in photographs taken with the 36-inch Crossley reflecting telescope which he had recently rebuilt. Himalia is Jupiter's most easily observed small satellite; though Amalthea is brighter, its proximity to the planet's brilliant disk makes it a far more difficult object to view.

Name 
Himalia is named after the nymph Himalia, who bore three sons of Zeus (the Greek equivalent of Jupiter).

The moon was sometimes called Hestia, after the Greek goddess, from 1955 to 1975.

Orbit 

Their orbits are continuously changing due to solar and planetary perturbations.

Physical characteristics 

Himalia appears neutral in color (grey), like the other members of its group, with colour indices B−V=0.62, V−R=0.4, similar to a C-type asteroid.
Although Himalia is the sixth-largest moon of Jupiter, it is the fifth-most massive. Amalthea is only a few km bigger, but less massive.
In May 2018, Himalia occulted a star, allowing for precise measurements of its size. The occultation was observed from the US state of Georgia.

Mass 

Exploration 

In November 2000, the Cassini spacecraft, en route to Saturn, made a number of images of Himalia, including photos from a distance of 4.4 million km.

In February and March 2007, the New Horizons spacecraft en route to Pluto made a series of images of Himalia, culminating in photos from a distance of 8 million km. Again, Himalia appears only a few pixels across.

Himalia ring 

In September 2006, as NASA's New Horizons mission to Pluto approached Jupiter for a gravity assist, it photographed what appeared to be a faint new planetary ring parallel with and slightly inside Himalia's orbit. Because the small (4-km) moon Dia, which had a similar orbit to Himalia, had gone missing since its discovery in 2000, there was some speculation that the ring could be debris from an impact of Dia into Himalia, suggesting that Jupiter continued to gain and lose small moons through collisions.
However, an impact by an object the size of Dia would produce far more material than the calculated amount of ejected material needed to form the ring, although it is possible that a smaller, unknown moon may have been involved instead.
The recovery of Dia in 2010 and 2011 disproved any connection between Dia and the Himalia ring.

Notes

See also 
 Moons of Jupiter

References

External links 
 "Himalia: Overview" by NASA's Solar System Exploration
 David Jewitt pages
 Jupiter's Known Satellites (by Scott S. Sheppard)
 Two Irregular Satellites of Jupiter (Himalia & Elara: Remanzacco Observatory: November 23, 2012)

Himalia group
Moons of Jupiter
Irregular satellites
19041203
Discoveries by Charles D. Perrine
Moons with a prograde orbit